The 12th Edward Jancarz Memorial was the 2009 version of the Edward Jancarz Memorial. It took place on 9 August in the Stal Gorzów Stadium in Gorzów Wielkopolski, Poland. The Memorial was won by host pair Stal Gorzów Wielkopolski: Rune Holta and Thomas H. Jonasson.

Heat details 
 9 August 2007 (Sunday)
 Best Time: 60.34 - Jarosław Hampel in Heat 3 (new track record)
 Attendance: 8,400
 Referee: Ryszard Bryła (Zielona Góra)

Notes:
# - there are a 2009 Speedway Grand Prix jacket numbers.
Holta (Norway) and Vaculík (Slovakia) started with Polish speedway licence.

Heat after heat 
 Holta, Jonasson, Jonsson, Kus
 Woffinden, Hancock, Vaculik, Skórnicki
 Hampel, Crump, Janowski, Pawlicki
 Holta, Jonasson, Pedersen, Zmarzlik
 Jonsson, Kus, Vaculik, Skórnicki
 Hampel, Woffinden, Hancock, Pawlicki
 Pedersen, Crump, Zmarzlik, Janowski
 Holta, Skórnicki, Jonasson, Vaculik (F/N)
 Kus, Jonsson, Woffinden, Hancock
 Hampel, Pedersen, Zmarzlik, Pawlicki
 Janowski, Holta, Jonasson, Szewczykowski (Crump T)
 Jonsson, Hampel, Pawlicki, Kus
 Janowski, Crump, Szewczykowski, Skórnicki
 Pedersen, Hancock, Zmarzlik, Woffinden (R4)
 Hampel, Jonasson, Holta, Pawlicki
 Jonsson, Crump, Janowski, Kus
 Pedersen, Zmarzlik, Skórnicki, Szewczykowski
 Holta, Hancock, Woffinden, Jonasson
 Pedersen, Jonsson, Zmarzlik, Kus (R4)
 Pawlicki, Hampel, Szewczykowski, Skórnicki
 Hancock, Crump, Woffinden, Janowski

See also 
 motorcycle speedway
 2009 in sports

References

External links 
 (Polish) Stal Gorzów Wlkp. official webside

Memorial
2009